Samui Centre of Learning, Koh Samui, Thailand, (SCL) was an international school established in 2004 by Phillip Olson, Rachel Anderson and Roz Thompson. 
The school offered a mixed international curriculum from nursery to secondary (nursery-Year 11). Samui Centre of Learning is the longest-running international school and an examination centre on Koh Samui.

Curriculum
Samui Centre of Learning operated within an international curriculum framework. Children received an hour of Thai language tuition everyday and learn about Thai Culture, Thai Music and Thai Dancing.

Most classes were taught by teaching staff holding either a PGCE, Bachelor of Education or, latterly, TEFL and were predominantly foreign nationals. Where necessary, children received EAL (English as an additional language) support from qualified TEFL teachers.

Levels/Classes
Foundation Stage: Foundation Stage 1-2
Primary Key Stage 1: Year 1-2
Primary Key Stage 2: Year 3-6
Secondary Key Stage 3: Year 7-9
Secondary Key Stage 4: Year 10-11
Secondary Key Stage 5: Year 12-14

Facilities
Samui Centre of Learning had air-conditioned classrooms, a science lab, a library and an ICT suite. The school building sat alongside the playground and a small playing field.

Notes

External links

School Website

International schools in Thailand
Educational institutions established in 2004
Educational institutions disestablished in 2018
2004 establishments in Thailand
2018 disestablishments in Thailand